Reverend Vince Anderson is a New York City based musician. He has had a regular show at Union Pool for decades, which Time Out describes as "somewhere between Wesley Willis and Tammy Faye Messner". His music is described as "dirty gospel". He has been described as a Brooklyn institution.

In the early 1990s, Anderson studied to become a Methodist minister, but dropped out to pursue music.

He appeared on the 2001 compilation This Is Next Year: A Brooklyn-Based Compilation (Arena Rock Recording Co.).

Partial Discography
 100% Jesus

References

American gospel musicians